Panther may refer to:

Large cats

Pantherinae, the cat subfamily that contains the genera Panthera and Neofelis 
Panthera, the cat genus that contains tigers, lions, jaguars and leopards
Jaguar (Panthera onca), found in South and Central America
Leopard (Panthera pardus), found in Africa and Asia
Black panther, a name for the phenotypic genetic variant that forms the black leopard or jaguar
Cougar, a big cat that is not in the subfamily Pantherinae, but is commonly referred to as a panther
Florida panther, a population of cougar

Art, media, and entertainment

Video games
 Panther (1975 video game), a battle tank-driving game developed for the PLATO system
 Panther (1986 video game), a flight game developed for the Commodore 64 and Atari 800XL/130XE
 Atari Panther, a cancelled video game console, expected to be released in the early 1990s

Other media
 Panther (film), 1995 British film
 Panther (owarai), Japanese comedy trio
 Panthers (band), American hardcore punk band

Brands and enterprises
 Panther (publisher), publishing house specialising in paperback fiction
 Panther Software, Japanese video game company
 Panther Westwinds, defunct British car manufacturer

People
 Yoshikazu Yahiro, Japanese metal guitarist, known as Panther and formerly as Circuit.V.Panther
 The Panther (Sam Brushell), Indian who lived in Otsego County, New York in the 1800s
 Anne Panther (birth 1982), German FIBA basketball official
 Clinton Panther (birth 1991), South African field hockey player
 Manny Panther (birth 1984), Scottish former footballer

Political groups
 Black Panther Party, Black nationalist organization
 Black Panthers (Israel), Israeli protest movement
 Dalit Panthers, revolutionary anti-caste organization founded by dalits in Maharashtra, India
 Gray Panthers, American organization promoting senior citizens' rights
 Polynesian Panthers, political group in New Zealand
 White Panther Party, political collective founded to support the Black Panthers

Science and technology

 PANTHER (Protein ANalysis THrough Evolutionary Relationships), a biological database of gene/protein families 
 DR DOS "Panther", the code-name of Novell's Novell DOS 7
 Mac OS X Panther, an operating system

Sports

Professional and amateur sports

Basketball
 GiroLive Panthers Osnabrück, a German women's basketball team
 Helsinki Panthers, a basketball club from Helsinki, Finland
 Les Panthères, nickname for Gabon's national basketball team
 Soweto Panthers, a South African basketball team

Ice hockey
 Augsburger Panther, a DEL ice hockey team
 ERC Ingolstadt aka The Panthers, a German ice hockey team in the DEL
 Embrun Panthers, an Eastern Ontario Junior C Hockey League team
 Florida Panthers, an American professional ice hockey team based in Miami, Florida, that competes in the NHL
 Nottingham Panthers, an ice hockey club in the EIHL

Rugby
 Blackpool Panthers, an English rugby league team
 Penrith Panthers, a rugby league team in the NRL
 Wests Panthers, an Australian rugby league team
 Western Panthers Rugby Club, Bulawayo, Zimbabwe

Other sports
 Carolina Panthers, an American professional football team based in Charlotte, North Carolina, that competes in the NFL and is in the NFC South division
 Düsseldorf Panther, an American football club from Düsseldorf, Germany
 Michigan Panthers, a former professional American football team based in Detroit, Michigan, that competed in the now-defunct United States Football League
 South Adelaide Football Club (Panthers), an Australian Rules football team in the SANFL
 The Panthers, nickname for Panionios, a sports club in Athens
 Red Panthers, nickname for Belgium women's national field hockey team

College and university sports
 Eastern Illinois Panthers, Eastern Illinois University
 Florida Tech Panthers, Florida Institute of Technology
 FIU Golden Panthers, Florida International University
 Georgia State Panthers, Georgia State University
 Middlebury Panthers, Middlebury College
 Milwaukee Panthers, University of Wisconsin-Milwaukee
 Northern Iowa Panthers, University of Northern Iowa
 Panamerican University Panthers, Universidad Panamericana (Mexico City, Mexico)
 Penn State Nittany Lions, Pennsylvania State University
 Pittsburgh Panthers, University of Pittsburgh
 USPF Panthers, University of Southern Philippines Foundation (Cebu City, Philippines)

High school sports
 Permian Panthers, the high school football team featured in H.G. Bissinger's book Friday Night Lights: A Town, a Team, and a Dream (1990)
 Barnsdall Panthers, Barnsdall High School, Barnsdall, Oklahoma
 Cedar Grove Panthers, Cedar Grove High School, Cedar Grove, New Jersey
 Chapman Panthers, Chapman High School (Inman, South Carolina)
 Colleyville Heritage Panthers, Colleyville Heritage High School (Colleyville, Texas)
 Cypress Lake Panthers, Cypress Lake High School (Fort Myers, Florida)
 Edgemont Panthers, Edgemont Junior - Senior High School, Scarsdale, New York
 Glencoe Panthers, Glencoe High School (Oklahoma)
 Hillcrest Panthers, Hillcrest High School (Dallas)
 Lake City Panthers, Lake City High School (Lake City, South Carolina)
 Lord Tweedsmuir Panthers, Lord Tweedsmuir Secondary School
 Middle Township Panthers, Middle Township High School, Cape May Courthouse, New Jersey
 Midlothian Panthers, Midlothian High School (Texas)
 Morehead Panthers, John Motley Morehead High School, Eden, North Carolina
 Palmetto Panthers, Miami Palmetto High School
 Parkdale Panthers, Parkdale High School
 Pine View Panthers, Pine View High School
 Pitman Panthers, Pitman High School, Pitman, New Jersey
 Point Pleasant Boro Panthers, Point Pleasant Borough High School, Point Pleasant, New Jersey
 Redmond Panthers, Redmond High School (Oregon)
 Springboro Panthers, Springboro High School
 Spring Lake Park Panthers, Spring Lake Park High School Blaine, Fridley, and Spring Lake Park, Minnesota
 Sterlington Panthers, Sterlington High School, Sterlington, and Monroe, Louisiana
 The Panthers, Browning School, New York, NY
 Reitz High Panthers, FJ Reitz High School, Evansville, Indiana
 Modesto High Panthers, Modesto High School, Modesto, California

Transportation

Aircraft
 Eurocopter AS565 Panther, military helicopter
 Grumman F9F Panther, jet fighter used by the US Navy in the Korean War
 PANTHER, the callsign for Falcon Air Express
 Rotec Panther, American ultralight aircraft
 Armstrong Siddeley Panther, British aero-engine

Land transportation
 Panther (amphibious vehicle), American amphibious car
 Panther (motorcycle), British brand
 Chevrolet Panther, codename for the 1960s car that would eventually become the Chevrolet Camaro
 De Tomaso Pantera, an Italian sports car
 Ford Panther platform, a sedan automobile platform
 Isuzu Panther, a multi-purpose vehicle
 Leyland Panther, a 1960s British single-deck bus
 Plaxton Panther, a coach body
 Panther Westwinds, a car manufacturer

Military
 Iveco LMV, a small armoured vehicle supplied to the British Army branded as the BAE Panther
 Panther tank, a medium tank used by Germany in World War II
 RG-33, Medium Mine Protected Vehicle, supplied to the US Army as the BAE Panther
 K2 Black Panther, main battle tank for Korean forces
 Panther KF51, prototype fourth generation main battle tank.

Ships
 , the name of at least five ships of the Royal Navy
 , a German gunboat, which sparked the Agadir Crisis in 1911
 SMS Panther (1885), an Austro-Hungarian torpedo cruiser
 , an Italian ferry in service 1962–1968
 , two vessels of the United States Navy
 German torpedo boat Panther (1940), a German torpedo boat of World War II

Other uses
Panther, Daviess County, Kentucky, an unincorporated community
Panther (legendary creature), a legendary creature featured in heraldry

See also
 The Panther (disambiguation)
 Panther Creek (disambiguation)
 Panther Mountain (disambiguation)
 Black panther (disambiguation)
 Black Panthers (disambiguation)
 The Pink Panther (disambiguation)
 Pantera (disambiguation)
 Panthera (disambiguation)

Animal common name disambiguation pages